Khamis Mushayt or Khamis Mushait is a city in south-west Saudi Arabia, located east of Abha, the provincial seat of the 'Asir Province,  650 nautical miles from Dhahran and  from the national capital of Riyadh. It is the capital of the Shahran tribe in the Asir region.
It is fifth-largest city in Saudi Arabia after Riyadh, Jeddah, Mecca and Medina, with an estimated metro population of 1,353,000 as of 2017. Khamis Mushayt is noted for being the fourth largest trading centre in Saudi Arabia, and is famous for its world-class military airbase.

History
Until the 1970s, Khamis Mushait was a small town of less than 50,000 servicing the surrounding mild-climate agricultural region. Since then its population has grown dramatically to reach over 1,200,000. The city is surrounded by farms producing agricultural crops.

King Khalid Air Base (KMX) has a  paved runway without customs facilities. The base was designed and built by US Army and Air Force engineers in the 1960s and 70s and has F-15 service facilities. During the Gulf War in 1991, the US Airforce had a base here from which they launched bombers on Baghdad.

Khamis Mushait was known by that name since the 1760s, it has been named after the market that used to be held on every Thursday of the week which is “Khamis” and it has been referred to Mushait Ibn Salem the head of Shahran tribe and the guardian of the market.

Climate
Khamis Mushait has a semi-arid  climate (Köppen climate classification BSk), although its high altitude of  makes it less extreme than most of Arabia. For instance, Riyadh is around  hotter on average throughout the year, despite being about  further from the equator.

Notable landmarks
Khamis Mushayt has several souks, including Khamis Souk and Silver Souq, both of which are noted for their silver jewellery, and Spice Souk. Notable hotels include Mushayt Palace Hotel and Trident Hotel. Also of note is Al-Hayat Hospital and Khamis Mushayt Mosque.

References

Populated places in 'Asir Province